Rufus Blodgett (October 9, 1834October 3, 1910) was a United States senator from New Jersey and Superintendent of the New York & Long Branch Railroad for 25 years. He served as the Mayor of Long Branch, New Jersey on five occasions.

He was the only person in either house of Congress to vote against the Sherman Antitrust Act.

References

External links

1834 births
1910 deaths
Mayors of Long Branch, New Jersey
County commissioners in New Jersey
New Jersey Democrats
Democratic Party United States senators from New Jersey
19th-century American politicians
People from Grafton County, New Hampshire